Mark Nzeocha (born January 19, 1990) is a German professional American football linebacker who is a free agent. He played college football at the University of Wyoming.

Early years
Nzeocha attended high school at FOS Ansbach. He began playing flag football as a 13-year old for the Franken Knights youth team, before moving up to the junior football team at 16.

He was a safety for the German National Team that won the 2008 European Junior Championships and that finished fifth in the 2009 IFAF Junior World Cup in Canton, Ohio. He received recognition by being named to the All-tournament team.

College career
His international exposure earned him a scholarship to play for the University of Wyoming. As a freshman, he played as an outside linebacker in 10 games, before being moved to free safety during the latter part of the season. The next year, he was moved to strong safety, finishing with 11 games played (two starts), 32 tackles and a forced fumble.

After earning the starting strongside linebacker position as a junior, he had a break-out season with 101 tackles (10-for-loss), one sack, two forced fumbles and two passes defensed.

In his last year, he was playing strongside linebacker in the base defense, middle linebacker in the nickel defense, and was a core special teams player. He was also leading the team in multiple defensive categories, before suffering a season-ending torn ACL in the seventh game against San Jose State University, finishing with 59 tackles (three-for-loss), two sacks, two forced fumbles, and five passes defensed. He was named to the Academic All-Conference team in three-straight seasons.

Professional career

Dallas Cowboys
Nzeocha was drafted by the Dallas Cowboys in the seventh round (236th overall) of the 2015 NFL Draft. The San Diego Chargers previously traded this pick to Dallas in exchange for Sean Lissemore. Due to his limited football experience, Nzeocha was targeted primarily because of his athletic ability. Entering the league as a 25-year-old rookie, he missed the entire preseason while recovering from a knee injury he suffered in college. Nzeocha began the regular season on the Reserve/Non-Football injury list and was activated until November 18. He only played in two games and was declared inactive for five.

In 2016, Nzeocha was used at middle linebacker during the preseason, posting an interception against the Los Angeles Rams. He suffered a strained Achilles tendon in the second game against the Miami Dolphins, which not only forced him to miss the rest of the preseason but also the first 4 games of the regular season. Nzeocha played in five games mainly on special teams and was declared inactive in seven contests.

In 2017, Nzeocha was the backup of middle linebacker Anthony Hitchens during organized team activities. On June 6, Nzeocha had his knee scoped, which delayed the start of his training camp. On September 3, he was released after the team acquired linebacker Jayrone Elliott in a trade and was re-signed to the practice squad.

San Francisco 49ers
On September 25, 2017, Nzeocha was signed by the San Francisco 49ers off the Cowboys' practice squad. He appeared in 10 games and had 4 special teams tackles. On January 26, 2018, Nzeocha re-signed with the 49ers.

On March 15, 2019, Nzeocha signed a three-year contract extension with the 49ers. During the season-opener against the Tampa Bay Buccaneers, Nzeocha intercepted Jameis Winston once in the 31-17 victory. The 49ers reached Super Bowl LIV but they lost to the Kansas City Chiefs by a score of 31-20.

On September 30, 2020, Nzeocha was placed on injured reserve. On December 19, 2020, Nzeocha was activated off of injured reserve. The 49ers declined to exercise the 2021 contract year on Nzeocha's contract on March 5, 2021, making him an unrestricted free agent at the start of the new league year.

On December 29, 2021, Nzeocha was signed to the 49ers practice squad.

Personal life
Nzeocha's brother, Eric Nzeocha played linebacker for the Tampa Bay Buccaneers. He is half Nigerian. He is now a licensed real estate agent in Prosper, TX.

References

External links
Wyoming Cowboys bio

1990 births
Living people
American football linebackers
Dallas Cowboys players
German expatriates in the United States
German sportspeople of Nigerian descent
German players of American football
People from Ansbach
Sportspeople from Middle Franconia
San Francisco 49ers players
Wyoming Cowboys football players
Expatriate players of American football
German expatriate sportspeople in the United States